Solinas is an Italian surname. Notable people with the surname include:

Franco Solinas (1927–1982), Italian writer and screenwriter
Giovanni Solinas (born 1968), Italian football manager
Marisa Solinas, Italian actress and singer
Simone Solinas (born 1996), Italian footballer

See also
Solinas prime, a class of prime number, named after Jerome Solinas

Italian-language surnames